State Route 16 (SR 16) is a  state highway that travels west-to-east through portions of Haralson, Carroll, Coweta, Spalding, Butts, Jasper, Putnam, Hancock, and Warren counties in the western and central parts of the U.S. state of Georgia. The highway connects the southeastern portion of Carroll County, northwest of Mount Zion to Warrenton, via Carrollton, Newnan, Griffin, Monticello, Eatonton, and Sparta.

SR 16 formerly traveled on the current path of US 278 Byp./SR 12 Byp. in Warrenton, SR 80 and SR 17 Conn., and the entire length of SR 296 west of Wrens, in Glascock and Jefferson counties.

Route description

SR 16 starts just south of Interstate 20 (I-20) in southwestern Haralson County, and travels southeast into Carroll County and Carrollton, where it begins a concurrency with US 27 Alt./SR 1. SR 16 continues through Whitesburg and crosses into Coweta County and through Newnan, where its concurrency with US 27 Alt. ends, crossing I-85 on the southeastern edge of East Newnan.

Turning sharply east, the highway travels through Sharpsburg, turns slightly southeast, and travels through Senoia into Spalding County, turning back east, and traveling into Griffin. Turning slightly northeast, SR 16 crosses I-75 at the county line with Butts County and travels into and through Jackson on into Monticello in Jasper County.

Continuing east, the route crosses into Putnam County, through Eatonton, then turns southeast at the county line with Hancock County, heading on into Sparta. Turning first slightly northeast, then southeast, SR 16 continues into Warren County, where it turns northeast once more and on to its eastern terminus in Warrenton.

There are four portions of SR 16 that are part of the National Highway System, a system of routes determined to be the most important for the nation's economy, mobility, and defense:
 Approximately  in Carrollton, most of it concurrent with US 27/SR 1 and SR 166
 The entire length of the concurrency with US 29/SR 14, from Newnan to south of East Newnan.
 The portion concurrent with SR 15 in Sparta

History

1920s and 1930s
SR 16 was established at least as early as 1919 on its current path from Carrollton to Warrenton. By the end of September 1921, it was extended west-southwest to the Alabama state line./ By October 1926, this extension was redesignated as part of a southern segment of SR 8. Two segments of SR 16 had a "completed hard surface": a portion in the southern part of Newnan and from Griffin to just east of the Henry–Butts county line. Between October 1929 and June 1930, a portion of SR 16 west-southwest of Griffin was completed. Later in 1930, the Spalding County portion of the Sharpsburg–Griffin segment was completed. About four years later, a portion north-northwest of Newnan was completed. At the end of the next year, the Jasper County portion of the Jackson–Monticello segment was completed. During the third quarter of 1936, a portion south-southeast of Newnan was completed. About a year later, a small portion in the eastern part of Monticello was completed. At the end of the year, it was completed from Monticello to Murder Creek. Later in 1938, three segments were completed: the Newnan–Senoia segment, the Jasper County portion of Monticello–Eatonton segment, and the Sparta–Warrenton segment. By the middle of the next year, two segments were completed: the Butts County portion of the Jackson–Monticello segment and a portion in the western part of Eatonton. At the end of the year, SR 16 was extended east-northeast on SR 12 for a very short distance in Warrenton and then on a sole path southeast to SR 17 north-northeast of Stapleton.

1940s and 1950s
Between April and October 1940, SR 16 was extended south-southwest to SR 80 in Stapleton and then south-southeast to US 1/SR 4/SR 17 north-northeast of Louisville. All of SR 16 from the Coweta–Spalding county line to Eatonton was completed. In 1942, the Senoia–Griffin segment was completed. Between the beginning of 1945 and November 1946, two segments were hard surfaced: the Carrollton–Newnan segment and a portion northwest of Sparta. Between February 1948 and April 1949, the Putnam County portion of the Eatonton–Sparta segment was hard surfaced. By August 1950, US 27 Alt. was designated on SR 16 from Carrollton to south-southeast of Newnan. The entire Eatonton–Sparta segment of SR 16 was hard surfaced. In 1952, the path of SR 16 southeast of Warrenton was shifted southward (and slightly extended to the east-southeast to SR 17 in the northwest part of Wrens). This replaced the path of SR 16S. The former part of SR 16 from southeast of Warrenton to northwest of Wrens was redesignated as SR 16 Conn. The former part from northwest of Wrens to north of Louisville was redesignated as SR 16 Conn. Between June 1955 and July 1957, the Warrenton–Wrens segment was paved.

1970s to 1990s
In 1971, a bypass of the main part of Carrollton was proposed from SR 166 southwest of the city to SR 166 east-northeast of the city. In 1973, SR 16 was extended west-northwest to its current western terminus. In Warrenton, the path of SR 16 was shifted southward, replacing SR 16 Spur. The western part of the former route was redesignated as SR 12 Conn. Between the beginning of 1979 and March 1980, a more direct path of SR 16, designated SR 721, was proposed from the eastern part of Griffin to the interchange with I-75 west-southwest of Jackson. Later in 1980, the path of US 27 Alt./SR 16/SR 166 in Carrollton was shifted southward, out of the main part of the city, onto the previously proposed bypass. SR 16 then traveled north on a concurrency with US 27/SR 1 to its original intersection with those two highways. In 1983, the path of SR 16, from Griffin to west-southwest of Jackson, was shifted southward, replacing the proposed path of SR 721. In 1989, the eastern terminus of the highway was truncated to its current terminus in Warrenton, replacing SR 12 Conn. The path of SR 80 was shifted eastward, replacing the Warrenton–Wrens segment of SR 16. The former segment of SR 16 in Warrenton was redesignated as US 278 Byp./SR 12 Byp.

Major intersections

Special routes

Warrenton spur route

State Route 16 Spur (SR 16 Spur) was a spur route of SR 16 that existed completely within the city limits of Warrenton. Between June 1955 and July 1957, it was established from an intersection with SR 16 in the southwestern part of the city to another intersection with SR 16 in the southeastern part. In 1973, the path of SR 16 in the city was shifted southward, replacing all of the spur route, except for the western part. The western part of its former path was redesignated as SR 12 Conn. Between the beginning of 1984 and the beginning of 1991, SR 16 Spur was redesignated as US 278 Byp./SR 12 Byp.

This table shows the 1957–1973 intersections.

Warren County connector route (1952–1981)

State Route 16 Connector (SR 16 Conn.) was a connector route of SR 16 that existed entirely within Warren County. In 1952, the path of SR 16 southeast of Warrenton was shifted southward, replacing the path of SR 16S. The portion of SR 16 from southeast of Warrenton to northwest of Wrens was redesignated as SR 16 Conn., while the portion from northwest of Wrens to north of Louisville was redesignated as SR 16 Conn. This highway traveled from SR 16 southeast of Warrenton to SR 17 about halfway between Wrens and Thomson. Between June 1955 and July 1957, this highway was paved. In 1981, it was decommissioned.

Warren County connector route (1982–1989)

State Route 16 Connector (SR 16 Conn.) was a connector route of SR 16 that existed entirely within Warren County. In 1982, it was established from an intersection with SR 16 southeast of Warrenton to an intersection with SR 17 about halfway between Wrens and Thomson. In 1989, this highway was redesignated as SR 17 Conn.

Jefferson–Warren County connector route

State Route 16 Connector (SR 16 Conn.) was a very short-lived connector route of SR 16 that existed in portions of Jefferson, Glascock, and Warren counties. In 1952, the path of SR 16 southeast of Warrenton was shifted southward, replacing the path of SR 16S. The former portion of SR 16 from southeast of Warrenton to northwest of Wrens was redesignated as SR 16 Conn., while the former portion from northwest of Wrens to north of Louisville was redesignated as SR 16 Conn. Later in 1953, it was redesignated as SR 296.

See also

References

External links

 
 Georgia Roads (Routes 1 - 20)

016
Transportation in Haralson County, Georgia
Transportation in Carroll County, Georgia
Transportation in Coweta County, Georgia
Transportation in Spalding County, Georgia
Transportation in Butts County, Georgia
Transportation in Jasper County, Georgia
Transportation in Putnam County, Georgia
Transportation in Hancock County, Georgia
Transportation in Warren County, Georgia
Griffin, Georgia
U.S. Route 78
1919 establishments in Georgia (U.S. state)